The 1951 All-Big Seven Conference football team consists of American football players chosen by various organizations for All-Big Seven Conference teams for the 1951 college football season.  The selectors for the 1951 season included the Associated Press (AP) and the United Press (UP).  The AP selected separate offensive and defensive teams in 1951; the UP selected a single 11-man team. Players selected as first-team honorees by both the AP and UP are displayed in bold.

All-Big Seven selections

Offense

Ends
 Mal Schmidt, Iowa State (AP-1; UP-1)
 Chuck Mosher, Colorado (AP-1)
 Bill Shaake, Kansas (UP-1)

Tackles
 Art Janes, Oklahoma (AP-1)
 Oliver Spencer, Kansas (AP-1)

Guards
 Stan Campbell, Iowa State (AP-1; UP-1)
 George Kennard, Kansas (AP-1)

Centers
 Tom Catlin, Oklahoma (AP-1; UP-1)

Backs
 Eddie Crowder, Oklahoma (AP-1; UP-1)
 Bob Brandeberry, Kansas (AP-1; UP-1)
 Junior Wren, Missouri (AP-1; UP-1)
 Buck McPhail, Oklahoma (AP-1; UP-1)

Defense

Ends
 Don Branby, Colorado (AP-1)
 Dennis Emanuel, Nebraska (AP-1)

Tackles
 Jack Jorgenson, Colorado (AP-1; UP-1)
 Tim Weatherall, Oklahoma (AP-1; UP-1)

Guards
 Roger Nelson, Oklahoma (AP-1)
 Stan Campbell, Iowa State (AP-1; UP-1)

Linebackers
 Bill Fuchs, Missouri (AP-1)
 Bert Clark, Oklahoma (AP-1; UP-1 [guard])

Backs
 Tom Brookshier, Colorado (AP-1 [HB])
 John Konek, Kansas (AP-1 [HB])
 Veryl Switzer, Kansas State (AP-1 [S])

Key

See also
1951 College Football All-America Team

References

All-Big Seven Conference football team
All-Big Eight Conference football teams